The Yamaha CP300 is a digital stage piano.

Introduced in 2006, the Yamaha CP300 offers almost identical specifications compared to the P250 it replaces. However, the primary sounds have been significantly improved, including emulation of "half-pedaling" effects. The addition of "C" in the name is an homage to the mid-1970s CP series of electric stage pianos, and also to distinguish it from P-300,  an economical 32-voice version of P-200, a flagship stage piano of that period. Other improvements include the addition of 5 sliders for real-time parameter control, a transpose button, and balanced output via XLR connectors.

Description
The Yamaha CP-300 has 88 graduated weighted keys. This means that the keys are somewhat heavier on the low end than the high. It has onboard stereo speakers, as well as an output for PA usage.  Yamaha digitally sampled in stereo each key at multiple attack intensities to obtain the tonal quality, presence, hammer and damper noises of an acoustic piano. The harpsichord (including pick noise), pipe organ, and some other instruments in main instrument set were also sampled.  The extended instrument set of over a hundred instruments are generated, rather than sampled.  The MIDI interface can control other instruments or be controlled.  It also has onboard digital recording and editing capabilities.  Like other stage pianos, it is built for touring.

References

CP300